Oleanna (anglicized from Oleana) is:

 Oleana, a community in Ole Bull's colony in New Norway, Pennsylvania
 "Oleanna" (song), a folk song mocking Ole Bull's ambitions of a perfect community
 Oleanna (play), a play named after the folk song, written by David Mamet
 Oleanna (film), a film based on Mamet's play, directed by the author and starring William H. Macy
 Oleana (clothing), a Norwegian textile company named after Ole Bull's Oleana community
 Oleana (restaurant) Cambridge, Massachusetts
 Oleana, a character from Pokémon Sword and Shield